In theoretical computer science, stuttering equivalence, a relation written as

, 

can be seen as a partitioning of paths  and  into blocks, so that states in the  block of one path are labeled the same as states in the  block of the other path. Corresponding blocks may have different lengths.

Formally, this can be expressed as two infinite paths  and  being stuttering equivalent if there are two infinite sequences of integers  and  such that for every block  holds .

Stuttering equivalence is not the same as bisimulation, since bisimulation cannot capture the semantics of the 'eventually' (or 'finally') operator found in linear temporal/computation tree logic (branching time logic)(modal logic). So-called branching bisimulation has to be used.

References

Formal methods
Logic in computer science